"Like This" is the second single from Mims' debut album, Music Is My Savior. It features guest vocals from Rasheeda. Junior Reid is featured in the video.

The track uses string productions, sampler, and synthesizer.

Remixes
The 2 official remixes were released with both featuring different artists, except Rasheeda & Sean Kingston, who are featured in both of them.

The 1st official remix, the main remix, features Rasheeda, Sha Dirty, Sean Kingston, Red Cafe, and N.O.R.E., the remix being featured on Mims' mixtape More Than Meets the Eye. There are 2 additional versions of this remix: both featured Sean Kingston, the first remix featured Red Cafe, and the second remix featured N.O.R.E.

The second official remix entitled as the "Reggae Remix," features Rasheeda, Sean Kingston, Mr. Vegas, and Vybz Kartel.

Charts

Certifications

References

2007 singles
2007 songs
Capitol Records singles
Mims (rapper) songs